Sahabatpur Union is a union of Nagarpur Upazila, Tangail District, Bangladesh. It is situated  4 km north of Nagarpur and 22 km south of Tangail.

Demographics

According to Population Census 2011 performed by Bangladesh Bureau of Statistics, The total population of Sahabatpur union is 27,533 .There are  households 6,576 in total.

Education

The literacy rate of Sahabatpur Union is 46.7% (Male-49.9%, Female-43.9%).

See also
 Union Councils of Tangail District

References

Populated places in Dhaka Division
Populated places in Tangail District
Unions of Nagarpur Upazila